Florida's 6th Senate District elects one member to the Florida Senate. The district consists of Baker, Bradford, Clay, Columbia, Gilchrist, Union counties, and part of Alachua county, in the U.S. state of Florida. The current Senator is Republican Jennifer Bradley.

List of Senators 
NOTE: The following Information was gathered from the Florida Senate website. Only records of senators from 1998-present are kept.

Elections 
NOTE: The following results were gathered from the Florida Department of State. Uncontested election results are not provided.

1978

1980

1982

1986

1990

1992

1994

2010

2012

2014

References

Florida Senate districts